Hasan Langi may refer to:
 Hasan Langi-ye Bala
 Hasan Langi-ye Pain